Sims's Lessee v. Irvine, 3 U.S. (3 Dall.) 425 (1799), is an early United States Supreme Court case about conflicting land claims. General William Irvine had been granted Montour's Island by Pennsylvania for his service in the American Revolutionary War, but the island was also claimed by Charles Simms of Virginia. The Court unanimously found in favor of Simms, who had the earlier claim.

The Court held that: "A military right to unappropriated land in America, acquired under a royal proclamation of 1763, was made assignable by the law of Virginia, to an inhabitant of that State.

Obtaining a warrant and so locating it as to describe a particular parcel of land, gave to the assignee a complete equitable title, which was confirmed by the compact between Pennsylvania and Virginia.

A survey in Pennsylvania, and payment of the consideration, gave a legal right of entry, which supports an ejectment. This right remains legal, though it may have originally been held so from a defect of equitable powers, and though the courts of the United States now possess those powers."

See also
 List of United States Supreme Court cases, volume 3

References

External links
 

United States Supreme Court cases
United States Supreme Court cases of the Ellsworth Court
1799 in United States case law
Aboriginal title case law in the United States
History of Pennsylvania
History of Virginia